Karlsruhe Palace was built in 1715 for Margrave Charles III William of Baden-Durlach after a dispute with the citizens of his previous capital, Durlach. The city of Karlsruhe has since grown around it.

History 
The first building was constructed by Jakob Friedrich von Batzendorf. The city was planned with the tower of the palace (Schloss) at the centre and 32 streets radiating out from it like spokes on a wheel, or ribs on a folding fan, so that a nickname for Karlsruhe in German is the "fan city" (Fächerstadt).

Originally partially made of wood, the palace had to be rebuilt in 1746, using stone. Charles Frederick, Margrave of Baden-Durlach at the time and who eventually became Charles Frederick, Grand Duke of Baden, then had the palace altered by Balthasar Neumann and Friedrich von Kesslau until 1770, adding larger windows and doors, pavilions and wings. In 1785, Wilhelm Jeremias Müller shortened the tower, adding a cupola.

During the Revolutions of 1848, Leopold, Grand Duke of Baden, was expelled in 1849 for some time. In 1918, the last monarch, Frederick II, Grand Duke of Baden, had to move out. The former residence of the rulers of Baden is now used as the Badisches Landesmuseum Karlsruhe.

Much of the city centre, including the palace, was reduced to rubble by Allied bombing during World War II but was quickly rebuilt after the war.

Gallery

See also 
 List of Baroque residences

References

External links 

 Badisches Landesmuseum Karlsruhe
 City wiki about Karlsruhe Palace

Palaces in Baden-Württemberg
Royal residences in Baden-Württemberg
Museums in Baden-Württemberg
Ethnographic museums in Germany
Museums of ancient Rome in Germany
History museums in Germany
Tourist attractions in Karlsruhe